Life, Love & Other Mysteries (stylized as life love & other mysteries) is the third album by contemporary Christian music group Point of Grace. It was released in 1996 by Word and Epic Records.

Two tie-ins to the album were released: a video, subtitled The Video Story, and an autobiography by the group, written with Davin Seay.

Background
The group characterized the album as their hardest to record. They called it a "growing pain" because John Mays, who had signed them to Word Records, had left the label. Shortly afterward, Word was sold, leaving the group to make all major decisions on their own.

Music videos were filmed for "Keep the Candle Burning" and "That's the Way It's Meant to Be," and a live video released for "Circle of Friends." The "Keep the Candle Burning" video featured footage from the group's four-city tour on the album's release day, including shots from the Dallas Mavericks' jet showing Terry Jones' husband, Chris; Denise Jones' husband, Stu; and Shelley Breen's then-fiancé, David, whom she married later that year.

"Circle of Friends" has been regarded as the group's signature song; a book by the group and their fan club both share this title. The current trio served as background vocalists on Kenny Rogers' cover of the song on his 2011 album The Love of God. Breen originally did not want to record the song, as she thought it was "kitschy, like a campfire song [or] 'Kumbaya' or something."

Since Heather Payne's departure from the group in 2008, they have performed the song "Keep the Candle Burning" as a medley with "The Great Divide," and "You Are the Answer" as a medley with "I'll Be Believing."

In addition to the album, an autobiographical book by the same title, subtitled "Advice and Inspiration from America's #1 Christian Pop Group," was released in October 1996. A video titled Life, Love & Other Mysteries: The Video Story was released in 1997.

Track listing

The Video Story

A tie-in video, Life, Love & Other Mysteries: The Video Story, was released in 1997. The video includes the music videos for "Keep the Candle Burning" and "That's the Way It's Meant to Be," as well as four live performances, and interviews with the group as well as their husbands and songwriter/producer Michael Omartian. In addition to the two studio videos, the live performance of "Circle of Friends" was released as a promo video, and was included on the WOW 1998 video and DVD.

Personnel 
Point of Grace
 Shelley Breen – lead vocals (1, 3, 5, 6, 7, 10), backing vocals
 Denise Jones – lead vocals (1-4, 6, 10), backing vocals
 Terry Jones – lead vocals (1, 3, 5, 6, 8, 10), backing vocals
 Heather Payne – lead vocals (1, 2, 3, 6, 9, 10), backing vocals

Musicians
 Byron Hagan – Hammond organ (1)
 Cheryl Rogers – acoustic piano (1, 5)
 Phil Naish – keyboards (2, 8, 10), Hammond B3 organ (8, 10)
 Michael Omartian – keyboards (3, 6, 7, 9), acoustic piano (7, 9)
 Blair Masters – keyboards (4)
 Tim Akers – keyboards (7, 9), synthesizer (7, 9)
 David Cleveland – guitars (1, 5)
 Dann Huff – electric guitars (2, 8, 10), guitar solo (2)
 Sonny Lallerstedt – acoustic guitar (2, 10), electric guitars (8)
 Jerry McPherson – guitars (3, 4, 6, 7, 9)
 Stuart Duncan – mandolin (7)
 Jackie Street – bass (1, 4, 5)
 Jimmie Lee Sloas – bass (2, 7, 8, 9, 10)
 Chris Kent – bass (3, 6)
 Scott Williamson – drums (1, 5, 7)
 Scott Meeder – drums (2, 8, 10), programming (2), percussion (10)
 Chris McHugh – drums (3, 6)
 Dan Needham – drums (4)
 Eric Darken – percussion (1, 3-7, 9)
 Mark Douthit – saxophones (3, 6)
 Doug Moffett – saxophones (3, 6)
 Jeff Bailey – trumpet (3, 6)
 Mike Haynes – trumpet (3, 6)

Arrangements
 Dan Muckala – track arrangements (1)
 Scott Williamson – track arrangements (1, 5), vocal arrangements (1, 4, 5)
 Point of Grace – vocal arrangements (1, 2, 4, 5, 8, 10)
 Phil Naish – vocal arrangements (2, 8, 10)
 Cheryl Rogers – vocal arrangements (2, 8, 10)
 Blair Masters – track arrangements (4)
 Jeff Borders – track arrangements (5)

Production 
 Point of Grace – executive producers
 Cheryl Rogers – vocal co-producer (2, 8, 10)
 Ronnie Brookshire – engineer, mixing (2, 4, 8, 10)
 Terry Christian – engineer, mixing (3, 6, 7, 9)
 David Schober – engineer, mixing (1, 5)
 Tim Coyle – additional engineer, mix assistant (1, 5)
 David Dillbeck – additional engineer, mix assistant (2, 8, 10)
 Doug Sarrett – additional engineer
 Scott Williamson – additional engineer 
 Tony Castle – assistant engineer 
 Eric Elwell – assistant engineer 
 Marc Frigo – assistant engineer 
 Shawn McLean – assistant engineer 
 Greg Parker – assistant engineer 
 Aaron Swihart – assistant engineer 
 Nick Sparks – assistant engineer 
 Jason White – assistant engineer
 John Thomas II – mix assistant (3, 6, 7, 9)
 Mel Jones – mix assistant (4)
 Ken Love – mastering 
 Lynn Keesecker – A&R direction
 Bridgett Evans O'Lannerghty – production coordinator (2, 8, 10)
 Suzy Martinez – production coordinator (3, 6, 7, 9)
 Christy Coxe – art direction
 Chuck Hargett – design 
 Michael Haber – photography 
 Patrick Swan – hair stylist
 I.B. Fishman – make-up
 Mike Atkins – management 

Studios
 Recorded at Woodland Digital, Masterfonics/Studio Six, Javelina Studios, OmniSound Studios, The Music Mill, Uno Mas Studio, Quad Studios and Great Circle Sound (Nashville, Tennessee); Tejas Recorders, Studio at Mole End, The Sound Kitchen and The Bennett House (Franklin, Tennessee).
 Mixed at The Sound Kitchen and Studio at Mole End; Sound Stage Studios (Nashville, Tennessee).
 Mastered at MasterMix (Nashville, Tennessee).

Reception
Allmusic gave the album three out of five stars. Dial-the-Truth Ministries, however, criticized Point of Grace for covering "Sing a Song" by Earth, Wind & Fire because of that group's new age influence.

References

1996 albums
Point of Grace albums
Albums produced by Michael Omartian